Beast Quest is a best-selling series of children's fantasy/adventure novels produced by Working Partners Ltd and written by several authors all using the house name Adam Blade. An editorial team at Working Partners first creates the storyline for each book and "then approach[es] a number of writers whose experience and style we think might suit the project and ask them to write a sample – usually the first three chapters of the book...” The editorial team picks the sample with the voice that we think works best for the project." The main series had achieved 146 books published by mid-2023.
20 million copies of the books have been sold to date.

The series is published by Orchard Books in the UK and by Scholastic Corporation in the US and is aimed largely at boys aged 7 and over. The novels have been described as "clearly and simply written, [striking] the right balance between adventure and story telling" and a "great series to get kiddies, who normally wouldn't be, interested in reading." The books take place in a world called Avantia, and focus on a young boy named Tom and his friend Elenna as they attempt to restore peace to the land by stopping beasts from causing destruction. Kathryn Flett, writing in London's The Observer, has called the books "almost certainly a work of publishing (if not quite literary) genius...Narnia meets Pokémon via Potter." The books are among the most-borrowed from UK lending libraries. There is also a companion science fiction series called Sea Quest.

There is also a 2015 mobile video game based on the book, and a 2018 version for Xbox One, Nintendo Switch and PS4 (Maximum Games). A new mobile version was released in May 2020 by Animoca.

See also

List of Beast Quest novels
The Chronicles of Avantia, a Beast Quest spin-off series 
Erin Hunter
Sea Quest, a Beast Quest spin-off series
Beast Quest New Blood, a Beast Quest spin-off series

Weblinks 
 Mobile Game: Beast Quest - Ultimate Heroes

References

Book series introduced in 2007
Series of children's books
Fantasy novel series
2000s books
Scholastic Corporation books
Orchard Books books